Altus AFB, Oklahoma(11 June 1952 – 21 June 1954)63d Troop Carrier Group/Wing
 Bergstrom AFB, Texas(22 March 1946 – 1 December 1948, 1 July 1957 – 1 October 1958,1 July 1966 – 1 June 1992)27th Fighter Wing (1957–1958)75th Reconnaissance Wing (1966–1971)67th Reconnaissance Wing (1971–1992)
 Blytheville AFB, Arkansas(15 April – 15 August 1946, 1 July 1954 – 1 April 1958)461st Tactical Bombardment Wing (1954–1958)
 Bunker Hill AFB, Indiana(22 June 1954 – 1 September 1957)323d Fighter Wing
 Biggs AFB, Texas(29 July 1946 – 1 December 1948)20th Fighter Group
 Brooks AFB, Texas(23 March 1946 – 13 January 1947)363d Reconnaissance Group
 Clovis/Cannon AFB, New Mexico(23 July 1951 – 1 June 1992)37th Fighter Wing (1953)50th Fighter Wing (1953)312th Fighter Wing (1954–1959)27th Fighter Wing (1959–1992)57th Fighter Weapons Wing (1970–1972)
 Charleston AFB, South Carolina(23 April 1952 – 1 March 1955)456th Troop Carrier Group/Wing
 Davis-Monthan AFB, Arizona(1 October 1976 – 1 June 1992)355th Fighter Wing
 Donaldson AFB, South Carolina(16 October 1950 – 20 July 1951)375th Troop Carrier Wing (1950)443d Troop Carrier Wing (1950–1951)
 Dow AFB, Maine(20 November 1946 – 1 December 1948)14th Fighter Group
 Dover AFB, Delaware(1 April 1946 – 1 December 1948)320th AAF/Air Force Base Unit
 Dyess AFB, Texas(15 October 1969 – 1 December 1974)516th Tactical Airlift Wing (1969–1972)463d Tactical Airlift Wing (1972–1974)
 Alexandria/England AFB, Louisiana(21 March 1946 – 1 December 1948, 1 December 1950 – 1 June 1992)366th Fighter Wing (1953–1959)1st Air Commando/Special Operations Wing (1966–1969)23d Fighter Wing (1972–1992)
 Eglin AFB, Florida(10 July 1968 – 1 June 1992)33d Fighter Wing
 Forbes AFB, Kansas(10 July 1968 – 1 December 1974)313th Tactical Airlift Wing
 George AFB, California(15 November 1951 – 1 June 1992)1st Fighter Group (1950–1951)479th Fighter Wing (1952–1971)21st Fighter Wing (1953–1954)31st Fighter Wing (1959–1962)355th Fighter Wing (1962–1964)8th Fighter Wing (1964–1965)35th Fighter Wing (1971–1992)
 Goodman AFB, Kentucky(1 December 1951 – 1 December 1952)348th Fighter Group/Wing
 Grenier AFB, New Hampshire(1947–1949)82nd Fighter Group
 Hill AFB, Utah(23 December 1975 – 1 June 1992)388th Fighter Wing
 Holloman AFB, New Mexico(1 January 1971 – 1 June 1992)366th Fighter Wing (1963–1966)49th Fighter Wing (1968–1992)479th Tactical Training Wing (1977–1992)
 Homestead AFB, Florida(1 July 1968 – 1 June 1992)31st Fighter Wing (1970–1992)
 Hurlburt Field, Florida(1 February 1955 – 26 June 1958, 1 July 1962 – 1 June 1992)17th Air Base Group (1955–1958)4420th Combat Support Group (1962–1972)1st Air Commando/Special Operations Wing (1962–1966, 1972–1992)
 Langley AFB, Virginia(1 May 1946 – 1 December 1948, 1 December 1950 – 1 June 1992)31st Fighter Group (1947)363d Reconnaissance Group/Wing (1947–1948, 1950–1951)47th Bombardment Wing (1951–1953)405th Fighter Wing (1953–1958)4505 Air Refueling Wing (1958–1963)463d Troop Carrier Wing (1963–1966)316th Tactical Airlift Wing (1966–1974)1st Fighter Wing (1975–1992)2nd Aircraft Delivery Group (1969-1994)
 Little Rock AFB, Arkansas(1 April 1970 – 1 December 1974)64th Tactical Airlift Wing (1970–1971)63d Tactical Airlift Wing (1971–1974)
 Lockbourne AFB, Ohio(1 July 1947 – 1 December 1948, 10 July 1968 – 31 August 1971)332d Fighter Group (1947–1948)317th Tactical Airlift Wing (1968–1971)
 Luke AFB, Arizona(1 July 1958 – 1 June 1992)405th Tactical Training Wing
 MacDill AFB, Florida(1 July 1962 – 1 June 1992)12th Fighter Wing (1962–1975)15th Fighter Wing (1962–1970)1st Fighter Wing (1970–1975)56th Fighter Wing (1975–1992)
 March AFB, California(1 April 1946 – 1 December 1948)1st Fighter Group (1946–1948)67th Reconnaissance Group (1947–1948)
 McChord AFB, Washington(1 April 1946 – 1 December 1948)62d Troop Carrier Group
 McConnell AFB, Kansas(1 July 1963 – 1 July 1972)355th Fighter Wing (1963–1964)23d Fighter Wing (1964–1972)
 Moody AFB, Georgia(1 September 1947 – 1 December 1948, 1 December 1975 – 1 June 1992)347th Fighter Wing (1975–1992)
 Mountain Home AFB, Idaho(1 January 1966 – 1 June 1992)67th Reconnaissance Wing (1966–1971)347th Fighter Wing (1971–1972)366th Fighter Wing (1972–1992)
 Myrtle Beach AFB, South Carolina(1 April 1946 – 1 November 1947, 1 April 1956 – 1 June 1992)342d Fighter-Day Wing (1956)354th Fighter Wing (1956–1992)
 Nellis AFB, Nevada(1 July 1958 – 1 June 1992)4520th Air Base Group (1958–1969)57th Fighter Weapons Wing (1969–1992)474th Fighter Wing (1968–1992)
 Otis AFB Massachusetts(1 December 1950 – 2 June 1951, 1 July 1969 – 31 May 1972)50th Fighter Group (1950–1951)1st Special Operations Wing (1969–1972)
 Pope AFB, North Carolina(1 April 1946 – 1 December 1948, 1 December 1950 – 1 December 1974)10th Reconnaissance Group (1946–1948)44115th Air Base Group (1950–1954)464th Troop Carrier Wing (1954–1971)317th Tactical Airlift Wing (1971–1974)1st Special Operations Wing (1969–1974)
 Sewart AFB, Tennessee(1 November 1948 – 1 December 1948, 1 December 1950 – 31 May 1971314th Troop Carrier Wing (1948, 1950–1966)463d Troop Carrier Wing (1959–1963)64th Troop Carrier/Tactical Airlift Wing (1966–1971)
 Seymour Johnson AFB, North Carolina(6 January 1956 – 1 June 1992)83d Fighter-Day Wing (1956–1957)4th Fighter Wing (1957–1992)
 Shaw AFB, South Carolina(1 December 1950 – 1 June 1992)20th Fighter Group (1947–1948, 1950–1951)363d Reconnaissance/Fighter Wing (1951–1992)66th Reconnaissance Wing (1953)432d Reconnaissance Group/Wing (1953–1963)
 Tonopah Airport Nevada(UNK - 1 June 1992)4450th Tactical Group (1982–1989)37th Fighter Wing (1989–1992)
 Turner AFB, Georgia(4 September 1947 – 1 December 1948, 1 December 1950 - 1958)348th Fighter Group (1951)31st Fighter Wing (1947–1958)
 Tyndall AFB, Florida(21 March – 15 May 1946, 1 October 1979 – 1 June 1992)5000th Aerodrome Group (1946)325th Tactical Training Wing (1979–1992)
 Whiteman AFB, Missouri(21 March 1946 – 14 December 1947)322d AAF/AF Base Unit
 Williams AFB, Arizona(1 July 1958 – 1 October 1960)4530th Air Base Group 

Notes: 
 Aerospace Defense Command (ADC) Air National Guard bases/units merged into ADTAC on 1 October 1979 not included.  
 Howard AFB Canal Zone/Panama (24th Composite Wing) was assigned to TAC 1 January 1976 – 31 December 1999.  
 Keflavik Airport Iceland (57th Fighter Interceptor Squadron) was transferred to TAC from ADC 1 October 1979.  Transferred to Air Combat Command 1 June 1992.

References

USA Tactical
Tactical Air Command bases